Banjo Billy's Bus Tours was a tour bus company based in Denver and Boulder, Colorado, operating guided tours in the local area. The company gained attention for its history and ghost tours.

Founding
The company was founded in 2005 by John Georgis, a Colorado native and former salesperson. Georgis purchased a school bus on eBay, refurbished the exterior with wood planks and the interior with couches, recliners and saddles, and began running tours in Boylder as Banjo Billy’s Bus Tours.  In 2007, Banjo Billy’s Bus Tours expanded to Denver.

Tour options
The tour buses, nicknamed “traveling hillbilly shacks", operated year-round.  The 90-minute guided history tours mix history, crime stories and comedy, with stops at points of interest in downtown Denver and Boulder.  Throughout October, Banjo Billy’s Bus Tours runs 90-minute guided ghost tours in Denver and Boulder.  The three-hour brewery tours in Denver operate weekly, with additional tours during the Great American Beer Festival, and include stops at four breweries.  Private tours are also offered. History tours and ghost tours depart in Denver from the Colorado Convention Center and in Boulder from the Hotel Boulderado. Denver brewery tours depart from Wynkoop Brewing Company.

References

External links
 "Official website"

Companies based in Colorado